ICE Data Services (formerly known as Interactive Data) was an American 1960s-founded Time-sharing services company that later became known for providing financial market data (financial data vendor), analytics and related solutions to financial institutions, active traders and individual investors. The company's businesses supply real-time market data, time-sensitive pricing, evaluations and reference data for securities trading, including hard-to-value instruments. The company was acquired by and folded into Intercontinental Exchange in December 2015.

Products
Interactive Data provided evaluation services, reference data, pricing services, derivatives services, Fair Value Information Services, low latency market data, trading infrastructure services, fixed income analytics, Web-based solutions, desktop solutions, the eSignal suite of products, and environmental, social and corporate governance (ESG) data including quantitative ESG risk indicators for individual companies and sectors (current figures as well as historical data for the past two years) provided by RepRisk, a global business intelligence provider specialized in ESG risk analytics and metrics.

History

Timesharing services
Founded in 1968 as a Waltham, Massachusetts-based time-sharing company, Interactive Data Corporation was acquired by Chase Manhattan Bank in 1974.

Like competitor National CSS (NCSS), their time-sharing service was based on IBM's CP/CMS Time-sharing software for the IBM System 360 Model 67. IDC focused on the financial industry, while NCSS had a broader client base.

In 1984, Chase expanded IDC by purchasing Western Union's Telstat Systems division.

Data services
In 2002 Interactive bought Merrill Lynch's securities pricing service.

Interactive Data became known as a supplier of financial market data and related offerings, "including data bases used for economic forecasting." Acquisitions have contributed to Interactive Data's growth, enabling the company to deliver an increasing range of services, while expanding into adjacent markets and extending its reach geographically.

Later on, Pearson PLC owned 61% of the company. In 2010 the company announced the completion of its acquisition by two private equity firms, Warburg Pincus and Silver Lake Partners.

In 2015, Intercontinental Exchange announced the acquisition of Interactive Data Corporation from Warburg Pincus and Silver Lake Partners.

References

Financial services companies established in 1968
Privately held companies based in Massachusetts
Financial data vendors
Warburg Pincus companies
Silver Lake (investment firm) companies
1968 establishments in Massachusetts
American companies established in 1968
Financial services companies based in Massachusetts